Habakkuk was a biblical prophet, from which the name originates. The Book of Habakkuk is the book of the Hebrew Bible he is credited with writing.

Habakkuk may also refer to:

 Habakkuk Commentary, a Dead Sea scroll
 Habakkuk and the Angel, a sculpture by Gian Lorenzo Bernini
 Project Habakkuk, an abortive project to build a huge floating airfield from ice during World War II
 Habakkuk (fanzine), a Hugo-nominated science fiction fanzine
 Habakkuk thesis, in economics

Music
 "'Twas on the Good Ship Habakkuk", a 1960s folk song by the fictional character Rambling Syd Rumpo

People
 Habakkuk Crabb (1750–1794), a dissenting English minister
 Enbaqom (the Ethiopian form of Habakkuk), Ethiopian abbot
 Paul Guldin, originally "Habakkuk Guldin" (1577–1643), a Swiss mathematician and astronomer
 John Habakkuk (1915–2002), an English economic historian
 Abacuk Pricket, English mutineer (Abacuk is the spelling used in the Wycliffe Bible)